The Republic of New Granada was a 1831–1858 centralist unitary republic consisting primarily of present-day Colombia and Panama with smaller portions of today's Costa Rica, Ecuador,  Venezuela, Peru and Brazil. On 9 May 1834, the national flag was adopted and was used until 26 November 1861, with the Gran Colombian colours in Veles' arrangement. The merchant ensign had the eight-pointed star in white.

In 1851, a civil war broke out when conservative and pro-slavery groups from Cauca and Antioquia departments, led by Manuel Ibánez, Julio Arboleda and Eusebio Borrero, revolted against liberal president José Hilario López, in an attempt to prevent emancipation of disenfranchised groups and abolition of slavery, in addition to a number of religious issues.

Colombian constitution of 1832
One of the prime features of the political climate of the republic was the position of the Roman Catholic Church and the level of autonomy for the federal states. In 1839, a dispute arose over the dissolution of monasteries by the Congress of New Granada. This soon escalated into the War of the Supremes, which raged for the next two years and transformed into a conflict about regional autonomy.

New Granada was reorganised in 1858 to form the Granadine Confederation in response to demands for a decentralized administration for the country.

Provinces

The territory of the republic was divided into provinces. Each province was composed of one or more cantons, each canton was divided into several districts.

The republic also included some territories in the peripheral regions of the country.

See also
Gran Colombia

 
1831 establishments in the Republic of New Granada
1858 disestablishments in the Republic of New Granada
States and territories established in 1831
States and territories disestablished in 1858